The FIBT World Championships 1939 took place in St. Moritz, Switzerland (Two-man) and Cortina d'Ampezzo, Italy (Four-man). St. Moritz hosted the two-man event for the second time after hosting it previously in 1938, along with hosting the four-man event in 1931, 1935, and 1937. Cortina d'Ampezzo hosted the two-man event previously in 1937. It was the last world championships that would be held prior to World War II and the last that would be held with bobsleigh events in separate locations until 2000 when the two-woman event debuted that year.

Two man bobsleigh

Four man bobsleigh

Medal table

References
2-Man bobsleigh World Champions
4-Man bobsleigh World Champions

IBSF World Championships
Sport in Cortina d'Ampezzo
Sport in St. Moritz
1939 in bobsleigh
International sports competitions hosted by Switzerland
Bobsleigh in Switzerland 
1939 in Swiss sport 
International sports competitions hosted by Italy
Bobsleigh in Italy 
1939 in Italian sport